New hermeneutic is the theory and methodology of interpretation (hermeneutics) to understand biblical texts through existentialism. The essence of new hermeneutic emphasizes not only the existence of language but also the fact that language is eventualized in the history of individual life. This is called the event of language. Ernst Fuchs, Gerhard Ebeling, and James M. Robinson are the scholars who represent the new hermeneutics. And it is said that language event (German: Sprachereignis, the word event) occurs continuously, not that the interpreter insists on the text, but the text continually asserts the interpreter. Fuchs' concern is not to ask for the meaning of the text, but to learn how to listen to unobtrusive language about human beings' existence according to the hermeneutical help given with the text itself. Fuchs' achievement lay in bringing the insights of Karl Barth, Rudolf Bultmann, and Martin Heidegger into fruitful conjunction. He sought to bridge Barth's Calvinist emphasis on the revealed Word of God with Rudolf Bultmann's Lutheran emphasis on the nature of human existence before God by employing a phenomenology of language derived in part from Heidegger's later position, arguing that both human existence and the being of God are ultimately linguistic - made available in language - and that theology is thus properly "faith's doctrine of language" (German: Sprachlehre des Glaubens). Theology's task is essentially hermeneutical, i.e., theology translates Scripture into contemporary terms and contemporary existence into scriptural terms. Fuchs' interest is language event with existential philosophy. Conversely, the reality of God's love is verbalized in Jesus' word and deeds recorded in the Gospels and is thus preserved as language gain (German: Sprachgewinn). In the freedom of proclamation God's presence in the gospel and the "Yes of love: happens again - that is, comes to be as language, opening up the future to authentic existence (faith, hope, and love).

References

Bibliography
 Cornelius Van Til (1974), The New Hermeneutic.

Hermeneutics
Exegesis